Nanometa is a genus of long-jawed orb-weavers containing the fifteen species. It was erected by Eugène Louis Simon based on the type specimen of Nanometa gentilis found in 1908. It is included in a clade of its own defined by nine morphological synapomorphies, along with the genus Orsinome.

Species
The following species are recognised in the genus :
 Nanometa dimitrovi Álvarez-Padilla, Kallal & Hormiga, 2020  — Australia (Queensland)
 Nanometa dutrorum Álvarez-Padilla, Kallal & Hormiga, 2020  — Australia (Tasmania)
 Nanometa fea Álvarez-Padilla, Kallal & Hormiga, 2020  — Papua New Guinea
 Nanometa forsteri Álvarez-Padilla, Kallal & Hormiga, 2020  — New Zealand
 Nanometa gentilis Simon, 1908 (type) — Australia (Western Australia)
 Nanometa hippai (Marusik & Omelko, 2017)  — Papua New Guinea
 Nanometa lagenifera (Urquhart, 1888)  — New Zealand
 Nanometa lehtineni (Marusik & Omelko, 2017)  — Papua New Guinea
 Nanometa lyleae (Marusik & Omelko, 2017)  — Papua New Guinea
 Nanometa padillai (Marusik & Omelko, 2017)  — Papua New Guinea
 Nanometa purpurapunctata (Urquhart, 1889)  — New Zealand
 Nanometa sarasini (Berland, 1924)  — New Caledonia
 Nanometa tasmaniensis Álvarez-Padilla, Kallal & Hormiga, 2020  — Australia (Tasmania)
 Nanometa tetracaena Álvarez-Padilla, Kallal & Hormiga, 2020  — Australia (Victoria, New South Wales, Tasmania)
 Nanometa trivittata (Keyserling, 1887)  — Australia (Queensland, New South Wales, Victoria)

See also
 List of Tetragnathidae species
Orsinome

References

Spiders of Australia
Tetragnathidae